Estonian Fund for Nature (Eestimaa Looduse Fond) or ELF is an Estonian environmental non-profit organisation.

Mission
Mission of ELF is to preserve the rich natural diversity in Estonia and the world through active cooperation with individuals, business enterprises, organizations and state institutions through the following activities:

 protection of endangered species and their habitats;
 preservation of characteristic Estonian landscapes and habitats;
 promotion of sustainable use of natural resources;
 raising public awareness about environmental issues;
 finding solutions to preserve clean environment for future generations

Founding
ELF was established in 1991 by biologists and conservationists and in close co-operation with World Wide Fund for Nature. WWF has remained ELF's main international co-operation partner. ELF is a member of IUCN.

Board and Executives
Board members:

 Rainer Nõlvak - Chairman of the Board
 Rein Einasto
 Üllas Ehrlich
 Andres Tarand
 Katarina Veem
 Lembit Maamets
 Riinu Rannap
 Henri Laupmaa
 Ahti Heinla 
 Anneli Palo
 Pille Tomson
 Riinu Rannap

The board is directing the activity of ELF convenes four times in a year and one third of its members will be re-elected in every two years (even years). The task of the Board is to give guidelines to the Executive Committee, workers and volunteers in planning the activities (approving annually the action plan and budget) and to counsel workers of the Fund in treating various issues. Members of the Board work on the voluntary basis.

Members of Executive Board in 2018:

Tarmo Tüür, Siim Kuresoo, Kadri Kalmus, Silvia Lotman and Kärt Vaarmari

Achievements

After the restoration of independence of Estonia in 1991 a political decision was taken to restitute properties including land to the former owners or their descendants. Since it is much easier to form new protected areas when the land is owned by the state, ELF took quick action to safeguard the future of valuable areas by proposing the establishment of new big protected areas and natural parks. This led to the formation of Soomaa and Karula national parks and Alam-Pedja Nature Reserve. The area of these taken together is about 740 sq kilometres.

During the following years, ELF has played a significant role in the establishment of tens of other smaller protected areas in Estonia. ELF has carried on inventories of valuable habitats - wetlands, old-growth forests and meadows and participates in designing the Natura 2000 network of protected areas. In recent years ELF has more and more activities dedicated to environmental education, public awareness and public participation in environmental decisions and activities.

Founders

 Aare Mäemets
 Ain Raitviir
 Aivar Leito
 Aleksander Heintalu
 Andres Koppel
 Andres Kuresoo
 Andrus Ausmees
 Ann Marvet
 Helve Anton
 Arne Kaasik
 Eerik Leibak
 Einar Tammur
 Erik Sikk
 Ervin Pihu
 Fred Jüssi
 Hans Trass
 Indrek Rohtmets
 Ivar Jüssi
 Jaan Viidalepp
 Jüri Keskpaik
 Kalevi Kull
 Kristjan Moora
 Mart Jüssi
 Mart Külvik
 Mart Niklus
 Martin Zobel
 Mati Kaal
 Nikolai Laanetu
 Peeter Ernits
 Aivo Pidim
 Rein Kuresoo
 Tiina Talvi
 Tiit Maran
 Tiiu Keskpaik
 Tiiu Kull
 Toomas Jüriado
 Toomas Tiivel
 Ülle Kukk
 Vaike Hang
 Veljo Ranniku
 Vilju Lilleleht

References

Nature conservation in Estonia
Environmental organizations based in Estonia